The Tomb of Sawai Singh is a 19th-century tomb built in Bundeli architectural style. The tomb has four bastions on all the four corners, with one large dome in the center and other smaller domes are near the bigger ones. The exterior side of these domes has full bloomed lotus petals as decorations.

References 

Monuments and memorials in Madhya Pradesh
Chhatarpur district
Tombs in India